Frédérique Rol (born 26 May 1993) is a Swiss rower. She competed in the women's lightweight double sculls event at the 2020 Summer Olympics.

References

External links
 

1993 births
Living people
Swiss female rowers
Olympic rowers of Switzerland
Rowers at the 2020 Summer Olympics
Sportspeople from Lausanne